The Monmouth Hawks refer to the 23 sports teams representing Monmouth University in West Long Branch, New Jersey. The Hawks compete in the NCAA Division I and are members of the Colonial Athletic Association, joining on July 1, 2022. The football team became an FCS Independent for the 2013 season, and moved to the Big South Conference on July 1, 2014. The women's bowling program was a charter member of the Southland Bowling League, a single-sport conference formed in January 2015, but moved that sport to the Mid-Eastern Athletic Conference after the 2017–18 season.

On January 25, 2022, Monmouth announced it would be leaving the MAAC to join the Colonial Athletic Association, effective July 1, 2022. At that time, its football team will leave the Big South to join CAA Football, which is administered by the all-sports CAA but is legally a separate entity.

Teams 
Monmouth sponsors teams in ten men's and eleven women's NCAA sanctioned sports:

Men's Intercollegiate Sports
 Baseball (Team article)
 Basketball (Team article)
 Cross Country
 Football (Team article) 
 Golf 
 Lacrosse 
 Soccer  (Team article)
 Swimming
 Tennis
 Track & Field (Indoor & Outdoor)

Women's Intercollegiate Sports
 Basketball (Team article)
 Bowling 
 Cross Country
 Field Hockey 
 Golf 
 Lacrosse 
 Soccer
 Softball
 Swimming
 Tennis
 Track & Field (Indoor & Outdoor)

References

External links